Ctenoplusia dorfmeisteri is a moth of the family Noctuidae. It is found in western, central and southern Africa, where it's known from Congo, Nigeria, Gabon, Ghana, South Africa, Mauritius, Réunion and from Yemen.

It has a wingspan of 30 mm.

References

Plusiinae
Moths described in 1874
Lepidoptera of West Africa
Insects of the Arabian Peninsula
Moths of Mauritius
Lepidoptera of Gabon
Moths of Sub-Saharan Africa
Moths of Réunion